Sean Thomas is a British journalist and author.  Born in Devon, England, he studied Philosophy at University College London. As a journalist he has written for The Times, The Daily Mail, The Spectator and The Guardian, chiefly on travel, politics and art. When he writes under the name of Tom Knox, he specialises in archaeological and religious thrillers. More recently he has written novels under the pen name S K Tremayne.

Writing career

His first Tom Knox thriller, The Genesis Secret, focuses on the Neolithic archaeological site known as Göbekli Tepe in Turkey, which Thomas visited as a journalist in 2006. The book speculates on the genetic and sociological origins of Christianity, Judaism and Islam, with particular attention to the trait of sacrifice. Noteworthy for several exceptionally gruesome episodes, it was an international bestseller, and has so far been translated into 21 languages.  The novel provoked controversy when the German Archaeology Institute complained that both a newspaper article and the book were based on "a falsified version of an interview with [chief archaeologist] Klaus Schmidt", which they argued constituted "a distortion of the scientific work of the German Archaeological Institute". Thomas has since returned to the Göbekli Tepe site, and its new associated sites - the ‘Taş Tepeler’ - summarizing his findings in a widely read article in The Spectator in 2022

His second Tom Knox thriller, The Marks of Cain was published in 2010. Centring on the little-known Cagot community who lived in the Basque Country, and the troubled history of the German empire in Namibia, it too was an international bestseller. In Germany, the ebook version, published under the title Cagot, was notable for its experimental use of interactivity and alternate reality games.

A third book, titled Bible of the Dead (or The Lost Goddess outside the United Kingdom) was published in March 2011 in the UK, and in the US in February 2012, and focuses on the Khmer Rouge, while taking in the cave paintings of France, and modern Chinese Communism.

In 2015, under the pseudonym S K Tremayne, Thomas published a novel called  The Ice Twins, about a London couple who lose a child, one of identical twins, and thereafter move to a remote island in Scotland. At this point the parents begin to suspect they have misidentified the surviving child. The Ice Twins became a Sunday Times Top Ten Bestseller in February 2015.

The same novel, translated as IJstweeling, went into the Dutch top ten bestseller list, following its publication in the Netherlands in March 2015. In May 2015, under the title Eisige Schwestern, the same book entered the Spiegel bestseller list, in Germany; the book went on to spend fifteen weeks in the German top ten. In September 2015, The Ice Twins, in paperback form, became a number one Sunday Times bestseller in the UK. As of December 2016, The Ice Twins has been translated into 29 languages, and has been a bestseller in various territories: including Brazil, France, Denmark, Finland and South Korea.

His second S K Tremayne novel, The Fire Child, became a top ten bestseller in Germany in January 2017, under the title Stiefkind. The novel entered the UK's Sunday Times bestseller top ten in February 2017. A third novel, Just Before I Died, was published in August 2018.

In January 2019, The Ice Twins became a Nielsen Silver Award winner, for selling 250,000 copies in the UK.

Personal life
Sean Thomas lives in Camden, north London. His ancestry is Cornish; his father is the author D. M. Thomas. He has written three novels under his own name, the second, Kissing England, won the Literary Review's "Bad Sex" award in 2000. Thomas's fourth book Millions Of Women Are Waiting To Meet You was a memoir of his lovelife; it was a best-seller, translated into eight languages, and was the Guardian newspaper's "paperback of the week" in May, 2007.

Works by Sean Thomas

As Tom Knox

The Genesis Secret (2009) 
The Marks of Cain (2010) 
Bible of the Dead (2011, UK) / The Lost Goddess (2012, US) 
The Babylon Rite (2012, UK; 2013, US) 
The Deceit (2013)

Sean Thomas

Absent Fathers (1996) 
Kissing England (2000) 
The Cheek Perforation Dance (2002) 
Millions of Women are Waiting to Meet You (2006)

As S. K. Tremayne

The Ice Twins (2015) 
The Fire Child (2016) 
Just Before I Died (2018) 
The Assistant (2019) 
The Drowning Hour (2022)

References

External links 
 Tom Knox books website

British writers
Pseudonymous writers
Living people
Alumni of University College London
1963 births
English male novelists